The Arab Democratic Socialist Ba'ath Party ( Ḥizb al-Ba‘th al-Dīmuqrāṭī al-‘Arabī al-Ishtirākī; French: Parti Baath arabe socialiste démocratique) is a neo-Ba'athist political party founded in 1970 and led by Brahim Makhous, a former Syrian foreign minister. It is a remnant of Salah Jadid's left-wing faction of the Arab Socialist Ba'ath Party – Syria Region. The party is based in Paris, France and joined the National Democratic Rally coalition in 1981.

Ideology
Unlike historic Ba'athism which advocates Ba'athist political control of the state, the Arab Democratic Socialist Ba'ath Party supports democratic pluralism. The party advocates the implementation of the laws enshrining freedom of speech, assembly, and equality of opportunities that, although included in the constitution, are not enforced. The party also supports the concept of class struggle.

Syrian Civil War
The Arab Democratic Socialist Ba'ath Party joined the National Coordination Committee for Democratic Change following the beginning of the Syrian Civil War, and has advocated dialogue with the government to ensure a handover of power whilst rejecting both external military intervention and the arming of the opposition. The party also supported Kofi Annan's peace plan. The party also has representation in the Syrian Democratic Council. (the political wing of the Syrian Democratic Forces)

References

1970 establishments in Syria
Arab nationalism in Syria
Ba'ath Party breakaway groups
Ba'athist parties
Democratic socialist parties in Asia
Nationalist parties in Syria
Political parties established in 1970
Political parties in Syria
Political parties in the Autonomous Administration of North and East Syria
Socialist parties in Syria
Syrian opposition